Andy Murray was the two-time defending champion but lost to Jordan Thompson in the first round.

Feliciano López won the title, defeating Marin Čilić in the final, 4–6, 7–6(7–2), 7–6(10–8).

Ranked 698th in the world, Thanasi Kokkinakis became the lowest-ranked player to win a match against a player inside the top 10 since Juan Ignacio Chela, then ranked 890th in the world, against Sébastien Grosjean in Amsterdam in 2001.

Seeds

Draw

Finals

Top half

Bottom half

Qualifying

Seeds

Qualifiers

Lucky losers

Qualifying draw

First qualifier

Second qualifier

Third qualifier

Fourth qualifier

References

Main Draw
Qualifying Draw

Singles